María Guðmundsdóttir may refer to:
 María Guðmundsdóttir (skier)
 María Guðmundsdóttir (filmmaker)
 María Guðmundsdóttir (actress)